Mary Richardson (1882/3–1961) was a Canadian suffragette.

Mary Richardson may also refer to:
Mary Richardson Kennedy (1959–2012), wife of Robert F. Kennedy Jr.
Mary Curtis Richardson (1848–1931), American impressionist painter
Dame Mary Richardson (British educator) (born 1936), British headteacher and educationist
Mary Jane Richardson Jones (1819–1910), American abolitionist, suffragist, and activist